Seneca Township may refer to:

Canada 

 Seneca Township, a historic township in Haldimand County, Ontario

United States 

 Seneca Township, McHenry County, Illinois
 Seneca Township, Kossuth County, Iowa, in Kossuth County, Iowa
 Seneca Township, Lenawee County, Michigan
 Seneca Township, Christian County, Missouri, in Christian County, Missouri
 Seneca Township, Newton County, Missouri
 Seneca Township, Monroe County, Ohio
 Seneca Township, Noble County, Ohio
 Seneca Township, Seneca County, Ohio

See also 

Seneca (disambiguation)

Township name disambiguation pages